Lotion is a low-viscosity topical preparation intended for application to the skin. By contrast, creams and gels have higher viscosity, typically due to lower water content.  Lotions are applied to external skin with bare hands, a brush, a clean cloth, or cotton wool.

While a lotion may be used as a medicine delivery system, many lotions, especially hand lotions and body lotions and lotion for allergies are meant instead to simply smooth, moisturize, soften and, sometimes, perfume the skin.

Some skincare products, such as sunscreen and moisturizer, may be available in multiple formats, such as lotions, gels, creams, or sprays.

Medicine delivery 

Dermatologists can prescribe lotions to treat or prevent skin diseases. It is not unusual for the same drug ingredient to be formulated into a lotion, cream and ointment. Creams are the most convenient of the three but inappropriate for application to regions of hairy skin such as the scalp, while a lotion is less viscous and may be readily applied to these areas (many medicated shampoos are in fact lotions). Historically, lotions also had an advantage in that they may be spread thinly compared to a cream or ointment and may economically cover a large area of skin, but product research has steadily eroded this distinction. Non-comedogenic lotions are recommended for use on acne prone skin.

Lotions can be used for the delivery to the skin of medications such as:
 Antibiotics
 Antiseptics
 Antifungals
 Corticosteroids
 Anti-acne agents
 Soothing, smoothing, moisturizing or protective agents (such as calamine)
Anti Allergens

Occupational use 
Since health care workers must wash their hands frequently to prevent disease transmission, hospital-grade lotion is recommended to prevent skin dermatitis caused by frequent exposure to cleaning agents in the soap. A 2006 study found that application of hospital-grade lotion after hand washing significantly reduced skin roughness and dryness.

Care must be taken not to use consumer lotions in a hospital environment, as the perfumes and allergens may be a danger to those who are immunodeficient or with allergies.

Cosmetic uses
Most cosmetic lotions are moisturizing lotions, although other forms, such as tanning lotion, also exist.

Cosmetic lotions may be marketed as anti-aging lotions, which can also be classified as a cosmetic in many cases, and may contain fragrances. The Food and Drug Administration voiced concern about lotions not classified as drugs that advertise anti-aging or anti-wrinkle properties.

Production

Most lotions are oil-in-water emulsions using a substance such as cetearyl alcohol to keep the emulsion together, but water-in-oil lotions are also formulated. The key components of a skin care lotion, cream or gel emulsion (that is mixtures of oil and water) are the aqueous and oily phases, an emulsifier to prevent separation of these two phases, and, if used, the drug substance or substances. Various other ingredients such as fragrances, glycerol, petroleum jelly, dyes, preservatives, proteins and stabilizing agents are commonly added to lotions.

Manufacturing lotions and creams can be completed in two cycles:
Emollients and lubricants are dispersed in oil with blending and thickening agents.
Perfume, color and preservatives are dispersed in the water cycle. Active ingredients are broken up in both cycles depending on the raw materials involved and the desired properties of the lotion or cream.

A typical oil-in-water manufacturing process may be:
Step 1: Add flake/powder ingredients to the oil being used to prepare the oil phase.
Step 2: Disperse active ingredients.
Step 3: Prepare the water phase containing emulsifiers and stabilizers.
Step 4: Mix the oil and water to form an emulsion. (Note: This is aided by heating to between 110 and 185 F (45-85 C) depending on the formulation and viscosity desired.)
Step 5: Continue mixing until the end product is 'completed'

Potential health risks

Acne 
Depending on their composition, lotions can be comedogenic, meaning that they can result in the increased formation of comedones (clogged hair follicles). People who are prone to acne or forming comedones often prefer lotions that are designed to be non-comedogenic (not causing outbreaks).

Systemic absorption 
All topical products, including lotions, can result in the percutaneous (through the skin) absorption of their ingredients. Though this has some use as a route of drug administration, it more commonly results in unintended side effects. For example, medicated lotions such as diprolene are often used with the intention of exerting only local effects, but absorption of the drug through the skin can occur to a small degree, resulting in systemic side effects such as hyperglycemia and glycosuria.

Absorption through the skin is increased when lotions are applied and then covered with an occlusive layer, when they are applied to large areas of the body, or when they are applied to damaged or broken skin.

Allergens 

Lotions containing some aromas or food additives may trigger an immune reaction or even cause users to develop new allergies.

There is currently no regulation over use of the term "hypoallergenic", and even pediatric skin products with the label were found to still contain allergens. Those with eczema are especially vulnerable to an allergic reaction with lotion, as their compromised skin barrier allows preservatives to bind with and activate immune cells.

The American Academy of Allergy, Asthma, and Immunology released a warning in 2014 that natural lotion containing ingredients commonly found in food (such as goats milk, cow's milk, coconut milk, or oil) may introduce new allergies, and an allergic reaction when those foods are later consumed. A paper published in 2020 by researchers at St. George's, University of London found that "frequent skin moisturization in early life might promote the development of food allergy, most likely through transcutaneous sensitization".

See also 

 Cold cream
Barrier cream

References

External links

 Lotions during the early 19th century

Dosage forms
Drug delivery devices
Skin care
Emollients and protectives
Toiletry